J (Sidi Rezegh) Battery Royal Horse Artillery are a Close Support Battery of 3rd Regiment Royal Horse Artillery. They were currently based in Caen Barracks in Hohne, Germany.

History

Madras Horse Artillery
J Battery was originally raised in India on 4 April 1805 as The Troop of Madras Horse Artillery, part of the Madras Army of the Honourable East India Company.  With the formation of another unit on 6 January 1806 (the 2nd Half Squadron, Madras Horse Artillery), it was renamed as the 1st Half Squadron, Madras Horse Artillery and 1st Troop, Madras Horse Artillery with the formation of a third troop (later M Battery, Royal Horse Artillery) on 25 January 1809.  By 5 August 1825, the Madras Horse Artillery had grown to 8 batteries and so was reorganized as two brigades; the battery was redesignated as A Troop, 1st Brigade, Madras Horse Artillery.  The last redesignation under the Madras Army (as A Troop, Madras Horse Artillery) came on 4 January 1831 as the brigade system was discontinued and the Madras Horse Artillery shrank to 6 batteries in a single sequence (A to F Troops).

As a result of the Indian Rebellion of 1857, the British Crown took direct control of India from the East India Company on 1 November 1858 under the provisions of the Government of India Act 1858. The Presidency armies transferred to the direct authority of the British Crown and its European units were transferred to the British Army.  Henceforth artillery, the mutineers most effective arm, was to be the sole preserve of the British Army (with the exception of certain Mountain Artillery batteries).  On 19 February 1862, the Madras Horse Artillery transferred to the Royal Artillery as its 3rd Horse Brigade and A Troop became A Battery, 3rd Horse Brigade, RA.

The battery was in South Africa during the Second Boer War (1899-1902). Following the end of the war, 160 officers and men left Point Natal for India on the SS Ionian in October 1902, and after arrival in Bombay, was stationed in Meerut, Bengal Presidency.

World War I

World War II
The battery was given the Honour title "Sidi Rezegh" for its action against a German attack during Operation Crusader, during which A Troop commander George Ward Gunn earned the Victoria Cross, and the battery commander Major Bernard Pinney was recommended for the VC.

Post war

See also

British Army
Royal Artillery
Royal Horse Artillery
List of Royal Artillery Batteries
Madras Horse Artillery Batteries

Notes

References

Bibliography

External links
 
 
 

Royal Horse Artillery batteries
Royal Artillery batteries
1805 establishments in British India
Military units and formations established in 1805